Badiucao (born c. 1986) is a Chinese political cartoonist, artist and rights activist based in Australia. He is regarded as one of China’s most prolific and well-known political cartoonists. He adopted his pen-name to protect his identity.

Early life and education 
Badiucao was born in c. 1986 and raised in urban Shanghai. His paternal grandfather was a pioneer filmmaker, who was persecuted after the communists came to power, sent to laogai farms in Qinghai during the Anti-Rightist Campaign, and starved to death. A few years later, his father became an orphan when his grandmother died in poverty on Chinese New Year's Eve. His father grew up with the help of neighbours and strived for university education, but was denied admission because of family ties.

Badiucao had no formal training in art while in China. He studied law at the East China University of Political Science and Law. He and his dormmates accidentally watched the documentary The Gate of Heavenly Peace after it was hidden in a pirated Taiwanese drama. Disillusioned with China, he moved to Australia to study in 2009. He worked as a kindergarten teacher for many years. His first political cartoon was about the Wenzhou train collision in 2011.

According to a 2013 interview, Badiucao admired three other Chinese political cartoonists at the time—Hexie Farm, Rebel Pepper and Kuang Biao.

Style and approach
Badiucao utilizes satire and pop culture references to convey his message. He often manipulates archetypal images from Communist Party propaganda to make subversive political statements. His work has been used or published by Amnesty International, Freedom House, BBC, CNN and China Digital Times, and has been exhibited around the world.

He asserts that the government authorities in China are very concerned that their suppression of human rights activism is attracting attention from international media.

In an early 2016 interview, he stated that “Cartoons and portraits can create a unified visual symbol, which can help spread the message and attract sustained attention, in order to create pressure from public opinion. Maybe this pressure can improve the situation for those who are imprisoned, as well as comfort the family members of the persecuted.”

Activism
Badiucao is extremely active and often responds quickly to prevailing news and events in relation to mainland China, Taiwan and the Chinese diaspora. He also responds quickly to news and events relating to other authoritarian countries such as Iran.

In response to the PLA-aligned Kathy Chen being appointed the head of Twitter in China, Badiucao drew Twitter's logo, a bird, impaled on the yellow star that is a feature of China's flag.

Badiucao has supported other artists and dissidents. In 2013, in response to the rape of six students by the school's principal and a local official, Ai Xiaoming from Sun Yat-sen University posted a topless picture of herself on Twitter, holding scissors, covered in writing above her breasts, "Get a room with me, let Ye Haiyan go", conveying a strong political message. In response, Badiucao posted a cartoon in which she became a big pair of scissors, with gun barrels protruding from her nipples.

In early 2016, he created a series of artworks supporting Wu Wei, a former head tutor at the University of Sydney, who had resigned after an incident in which he referred to certain students from mainland China as 'pigs'. Wu Wei had used the character tun (豚), instead of the more commonly used character, zhu (猪). Online dissidents have co-opted tun as a slang reference to guan'erdai, the second-generation offspring of Chinese Communist Party officials.

In May 2016, the newly elected President of Taiwan, Tsai Ing-wen, was subject to an attack upon her marital status by Wang Weixing, a scholar with the Chinese People's Liberation Army. Badiucao highlighted the irony of the attack with a cartoon comparing Tsai’s marital status to that of Xi Jinping, current General Secretary of the Chinese Communist Party.

After Xi Jinping toured state media, Badiucao depicted General Secretary Xi being greeted by a cast of monkeys and snakes. This alludes to the media’s role as a ‘mouthpiece of the Party’. The Mandarin term for mouthpiece (喉舌) equates to 'throat and tongue' and is a homophone for monkey snake (猴蛇).

In 2018, an art show about Badiucao was planned to be held in Hong Kong. However, the show has been canceled due to "safety concerns" later due to threats made by the Chinese authorities regarding the artist. In 2019, a planned artist talk about activism with Hong Kong musician-activist Denise Ho at the National Gallery of Victoria in Melbourne was rejected by the gallery for “security reasons." On the anniversary of the Tiananmen Square massacre, in June 2019, a documentary about Badiucao was shown on Australian television.

References

External links 

Living people
Chinese cartoonists
Chinese contemporary artists
Artists from Shanghai
Australian people of Chinese descent
Year of birth uncertain
East China University of Political Science and Law alumni
Anonymous artists
Year of birth missing (living people)